"Game Over" is a song by Dutch DJs Martin Garrix and Loopers. It was released on 20 April 2018 via Garrix's Netherlands-based record label Stmpd Rcrds.

Background
Consisting of a softer drop, "Game Over" was first premiered at the 2017 Tomorrowland Music Festival. Garrix announced the track's release through his social media accounts.

Charts

References

2018 singles
2018 songs
Martin Garrix songs
Songs written by Martin Garrix
Stmpd Rcrds singles
Electro house songs